Heinz Volkmer is an Austrian bobsledder who competed in the late 1920s and early 1930s. He won a bronze medal in the two-man event at the 1931 FIBT World Championships in Oberhof.

References
Bobsleigh two-man world championship medalists since 1931

Austrian male bobsledders
Possibly living people
Year of birth missing